Mount Perkins is a 12,566-foot-elevation (3,830 meter) mountain summit located on the crest of the Sierra Nevada mountain range in northern California. It is situated on the common border of Fresno County with Inyo County, as well as the boundary between John Muir Wilderness and Kings Canyon National Park. Climbing routes to the summit include the west slope, and the north and south ridges. The John Muir Trail traverses below the west base of the peak on its descent south from Pinchot Pass, providing an approach to the mountain.

History
This mountain was named by Sierra Club member Robert D. Pike in 1906 in honor of George Clement Perkins (1839–1923), a Sierra Club charter member, 14th Governor of California (1880–1883), and United States Senator from California (1893–1915). The first ascent of the summit was made in 1910 by Dave King.

Climate
According to the Köppen climate classification system, Mount Perkins has an alpine climate. Most weather fronts originate in the Pacific Ocean, and travel east toward the Sierra Nevada mountains. As fronts approach, they are forced upward by the peaks, causing them to drop their moisture in the form of rain or snowfall onto the range (orographic lift). Precipitation runoff from this mountain drains west into headwaters of the South Fork Kings River, and east to the Owens Valley via Armstrong Canyon.

See also
 
 List of mountain peaks of California

References

External links
 Weather forecast: Mount Perkins
 Mt. Perkins photo: Flickr

Mountains of Fresno County, California
Mountains of Kings Canyon National Park
Inyo National Forest
Mountains of Inyo County, California
Mountains of the John Muir Wilderness
North American 3000 m summits
Mountains of Northern California
Sierra Nevada (United States)